These are the official results of the men's 4 × 100 metres relay event at the 1968 Summer Olympics in Mexico City, Mexico. The event was held on Saturday and Sunday, 19 and 20 October 1968.  There were a total number of 19 nations competing. The race was won by the United States in world record time.

During the heats, Jamaica had equalled the world record 38.6 (38.65) and improved upon it in the semi-finals 38.3 (38.39).

The random seeding of the final had semifinal 1 winner, with the fastest time, Jamaica in lane 5, but semifinal 2 winner Cuba in lane one and semifinal 2 runner up United States in lane 2, both regarded as inferior lanes.  While Charles Greene got a quick start, USA struggled with poor handoffs so East Germany in lane 4 was the clear leader on the backstretch, with Jamaica and Cuba the closest competitors and Mel Pender racing to catch up.  Through the turn Ronnie Ray Smith continued to chase Pablo Montes.  East Germany still had the lead going into the final handoff, USA still behind Cuba but with a smooth handoff and France in competitive position.    The East Germans took three attempts to finally make a handoff, losing ground.  Once with baton in hand Jim Hines was clearly faster than Enrique Figuerola, catching him halfway down the straightaway and on to a two-metre victory.  Lennox Miller equally outran Harald Eggers, but Roger Bambuck was able to hold off Miller and dive for the bronze medal for France.

The USA's time was a Fully automatic timing world record that was faster than the hand timed mark from before the Olympics.  Miller had been the anchor of that previous record as well as the two Jamaican records earlier in the competition, though the 1967 USC record was never accepted as a world record by the IAAF because Miller was from a different country from his teammates (who included Earl McCullouch and O. J. Simpson).

Medalists

Records
These were the standing World and Olympic records (in seconds) prior to the 1968 Summer Olympics.

Results

Final
Held on Sunday 20 October 1968

Semifinals
Held on Saturday 19 October 1968

Heat 1

Heat 2

Heats
Held on Saturday 19 October 1968

Heat 1

Heat 2

Heat 3

References

External links
 Official Report
 Results

R
Relay foot races at the Olympics
4 × 100 metres relay
Men's events at the 1968 Summer Olympics